KUTR (820 AM) is a Contemporary Christian formatted radio station in Salt Lake City Utah. The radio station is owned by Julie Epperson.

At its inception KUTR was a female talk station featuring local and national talk programs.  Due to low ratings the station dropped the talk format and became a 24/7 LDS music station, using the "Soft Sunday Sounds" branding of its sister-station, KSFI-FM.

In 2008 the station was sold to Julie Epperson and began airing a Christian contemporary format, mixed with talk. KUTR, when owned by Bonneville, acquired HD Radio for the station; however, the station was forced to turn HD off during the night to avoid interference with other stations.

Today KUTR under its new owner maintains the HD signal, but there have been times when it is not operating. As of November 30, 2018, KUTR is no longer broadcasting in HD.

KUTR is licensed to Taylorsville; however, the towers for the station are located outside Cedar Fort.

Translators
In addition to AM 820, KUTR can be heard also on FM. The information is listed below.

References

External links 

Billboard Radio Monitor article on station's demise
KUTR's towers along with other AM towers in the area

UTR
Mass media in Salt Lake City
Radio stations established in 2005